José Mario Váldez (born 19 March 1931) is a Salvadoran former sports shooter. He competed in the 50 metre rifle, prone event at the 1972 Summer Olympics.

References

External links

1931 births
Possibly living people
Salvadoran male sport shooters
Olympic shooters of El Salvador
Shooters at the 1972 Summer Olympics
Place of birth missing (living people)